James Zachos is an American paleoclimatologist, oceanographer, and marine scientist. He is currently a professor and chair of the Department of Earth and Planetary sciences at University of California, Santa Cruz where he was elected to the National Academy of Sciences in 2017. He has conducted research on a wide variety of topics related to biological, chemical, and climatic evolution of late Cretaceous and Cenozoic oceans, and is credited with developing a new understanding of long-term climate change and climate transitions over the past 65 million years . His investigations of past climatic conditions help predict the consequences of anthropogenic carbon emissions on future climate change.

Overview 
Professor Zachos has co-authored over 160 publications and has been invited to give over 140 lectures at institutions, universities, and conferences around the world, including Stanford University, University of Cambridge, and Utrecht University, University of Sao Paolo, and International Conference on Paleoceanography VIII. He has also participated on multiple Ocean Drilling Program (ODP) Expeditions to the Arctic and Southern Ocean, Pacific and Indian Oceans. In 2003, Zachos served as the co-chief scientist of Leg 208 expedition to the south Atlantic.

Zachos is a fellow worker of the Geological Society of America, American Academy of Arts and Sciences, and American Geophysical Union. In 2016, he received the Milutin Milankovic Medal by the European Geosciences Union, which is awarded to scientists for their outstanding research in long-term climatic changes and modelling.

Research 
Zachos’ research is focused on the biological, chemical, and climatic evolution of late Cretaceous and Cenozoic oceans (i.e., the last 66 million years). This research typically involves analysis of the chemical and isotopic composition of fossil shells from marine sediments to reconstruct past changes ice-volume, ocean temperatures, circulation, productivity, and carbon cycling. Combined with numerical models, such observations are used to determine the mechanisms responsible for the long and short-term changes in global climate. Presently, Zachos’ research group is studying several episodes of rapid and extreme changes in climate, including the Paleocene-Eocene Thermal Maximum.

Academic Background
In 1981 Zachos received bachelor's degrees in Geology and Economics from the State University of New York, Oneonta. Zachos obtained his M.S. in Geology (1983) at The University of South Carolina and a Ph.D. in Geological oceanography at the University of Rhode Island.  After completing his education, he pursued a postdoctoral fellowship at University of Michigan from 1988 to 1990 before joining the faculty of the Department of Earth Sciences UC Santa Cruz in 1992. In 2000, he was a visiting fellow at the University of Cambridge.

Recognition 

 2022 - BBVA Foundation Frontiers of Knowledge Award in the category "Climate Change".
 2018 - Foreign Member, Royal Netherlands Academy of Arts and Sciences

References 

Year of birth missing (living people)
Living people
University of Michigan fellows
Members of the Royal Netherlands Academy of Arts and Sciences
Members of the United States National Academy of Sciences
University of California, Santa Cruz faculty